Bernie Miklasz (born Bernard Joseph Miklasz February 15, 1959) is an American sportswriter and sports radio personality. He currently hosts the weekday afternoon show on 590 The Fan. He was the lead sports columnist at the St. Louis Post Dispatch from 1999 to 2015. He previously hosted the morning show on 101 ESPN in St. Louis until May 1, 2020.
Miklasz is a native of Baltimore, Maryland, and moved to St. Louis in 1985 to cover professional football for the Post-Dispatch. He has also worked at the Baltimore News-American and The Dallas Morning News.

Selection committees 
Heisman Trophy in college football
Member of the Board of Selectors for the Pro Football Hall of Fame.
As a member of the Baseball Writers' Association of America votes for:
Baseball Hall of Fame inductees
National League Cy Young Award
MLB Most Valuable Player Award
MLB Rookie of the Year Award
MLB Manager of the Year Award

Personal life 
Bernie Miklasz lives in St. Louis, Missouri and is married.

Footnotes

External links 
"Bernie's Best" book by Bernie Miklasz

1959 births
American columnists
American male journalists
American sports radio personalities
American talk radio hosts
Baseball writers
Writers from Baltimore
Writers from St. Louis
Sports in St. Louis
St. Louis Post-Dispatch people
Living people
Sportswriters from Maryland